The Craney Island Light was a screwpile lighthouse located just east of Craney Island at the mouth of the Elizabeth River in Virginia. This light replaced the first permanently stationed lightship in the United States.

History
Craney Island forms the west side of the entrance to Norfolk's harbor and has been used as a military facility since the War of 1812. In 1820 a lightship was stationed off its eastern side to protect the edge of the channel. This ship had previously been stationed off Willoughby's Shoal, but was quickly moved after it was determined that the first location was too exposed. This was the first permanent lightship station in the country; it was replaced in 1859 by the first of two screw-pile lights, a square house which survived until 1884. In that year the decrepit structure was replaced with a new hexagonal house, which in turn was removed in 1936, to be replaced by an automated light on the old foundation. In the early 1970s the light was completely removed and replaced by a buoy. Although not a historical name for the ship or station, a lightship named Portsmouth commemorates the first lightship at Craney Island at the Portsmouth Naval Shipyard Museum in Portsmouth, Virginia.

References

Craney Island Light, from the Chesapeake Chapter of the United States Lighthouse Society

Lighthouses in Virginia
Lighthouses completed in 1859
Houses completed in 1884
1859 establishments in Virginia
1936 disestablishments in Virginia
Buildings and structures in Portsmouth, Virginia
Hexagonal buildings
Lighthouses in the Chesapeake Bay
Buildings and structures demolished in 1936